The People's Fighters: Teofilo Stevenson and the Legend of Cuban Boxing is a 2018 documentary film directed by Peter Berg and Diego Hurtado de Mendoza that aired on the Olympic Channel in the United States. Narrated by Peter Berg, the documentary includes archival footage as well as interviews with other Cuban Olympic medal winners.

Plot 
With a population of just 11 million people, Cuba has produced the most Olympic boxing medalists of any country in the world, winning 73 Olympic medals including 38 gold medals in the past 50 years. The documentary examines Teófilo Stevenson's career as well as the phenomenon of boxing in Cuba overall.

Cast
Emilio Correa Sr.
Jorge Hernández
Armando Martínez
José Gómez Mustelier
Rolando Garbey
Félix Savón
Alcides Sagarra Carón
Oscar De La Hoya
Peter Berg (narrator)

Production
The film was produced as the second film in the Five Rings Films series. Filming took place in the United States and Cuba.

Broadcast
The film was broadcast on the Olympic Channel in the United States on May 31, 2018.

Reception
ESPN staff writer Nigel Collins wrote, "Those who have not seen the freakish power in Stevenson's right hand are in for a treat. The documentary celebrates his dominance with footage of Teofilo dispatching U.S. hopefuls Duane Bobick, Tyrell Briggs and John Tate with alarming ease." He continued, "One of major strengths of 'The People's Fighter' is allowing the story to be told from the Cuban point of view. Berg's narration is smooth and informative but never presumptuous. The opinions are those of the people on the ground, the ones that count, the real stars of the film."

The International Sport Movies TV Federation called it "an in-depth look at Cuba’s overwhelming history of success in the sport of boxing."

References

External links
 

2018 television films
2018 documentary films
American television films
Documentary films about boxing
Documentary films about Cuba
Films directed by Peter Berg
Films shot in Cuba
Films shot in the United States
2010s Spanish-language films
2018 films
2010s English-language films
2018 multilingual films
American multilingual films